Randy Andreachuk (born July 19, 1954) is a Canadian former professional ice hockey player. He played in two World Hockey Association games with the Winnipeg Jets during the 1974–75 season. His National Hockey League rights were traded in 1974 by the Philadelphia Flyers to the St. Louis Blues, along with  a draft pick, in exchange for Wayne Stephenson.

References

External links

1954 births
Calgary Centennials players
Canadian ice hockey centres
Ice hockey people from Alberta
Kamloops Chiefs players
Living people
Medicine Hat Tigers players
Philadelphia Flyers draft picks
Roanoke Valley Rebels (SHL) players
San Diego Mariners (PHL) players
Sportspeople from Lethbridge
Winnipeg Jets (WHA) draft picks
Winnipeg Jets (WHA) players
Winston-Salem Polar Twins (SHL) players
World Hockey Association first round draft picks